Apokalypso – Bombenstimmung in Berlin is a 1999 German thriller made-for-TV film, starring Armin Rohde and Andrea Sawatzki. It was directed by Martin Walz. The film was first shown at Oldenburg International Film Festival.

Plot
A bomb specialist runs against time to save Berlin from an atomic catastrophe, planned by a fanatic sect.

Cast

Reception
Apokalypso was nominated for two Adolf Grimme Awards, one of the most prestigious awards for German television. The film was nominated for "Fiction/Entertainment" and "Outstanding Individual Achievement" (for Rohde and Sawatzki performances), but lost both.

References

External links
 

1999 films
1999 television films
German television films
1990s German-language films
German-language television shows
Films set in Berlin
Films set around New Year
ProSieben original programming